The Pac-12 Conference softball tournament is the conference tournament in softball for the Pac-12 Conference. It is a single-elimination tournament and seeding is based on Pac-12 regular season standings. The winner receives the conference's automatic bid to the NCAA Division I softball tournament.

The Pac-12 was one of the few conferences to not host a conference tournament at the end of the regular season.  After several years of consideration, the tournament will begin in 2023.

Tournament
The Pac-12 softball tournament is a single-elimination tournament which in 2023 will be held at Rita Hillenbrand Memorial Stadium in Tucson, Arizona.  All nine of the Pac-12 schools which field softball teams qualify for the tournament. (Colorado, USC & Washington State do not field a team).  The winner earns the Pac-12's guaranteed bid to the NCAA tournament.

Champions

By school

References